Dussiella is a genus of fungi within the Clavicipitaceae family.

The genus name of Dussiella is in honour of Antoine Duss (1840–1924), who was a Swiss botanist.

The genus was circumscribed by Narcisse Théophile Patouillard in Bull. Soc. Mycol. France Vol.6 on page 107 in 1890.

References

External links
Index Fungorum

Sordariomycetes genera
Clavicipitaceae